The Pakistan Naval Station Darmaan Jah or PNS Darmaan Jah Hospital (meaning: place of Cure and Healing in Balochi) is a naval medical treatment facility and hospital located in Ormara, Balochistan Province. 

It is the first ever hospital facility established at Ormara, inaugurated by Chief of Naval Staff, Admiral Noman Bashir on September 12, 2011. The PNS Darmaan Jah is a 100-bed hospital.

See also
 Pakistan Navy

References

External links 
Pakistan Navy's official site
Pakistan Navy Hospitals

Hospital buildings completed in 2011
Hospitals in Balochistan
Darmaan
Hospitals established in 2011
Military medical facilities in Pakistan
Ormara